By-elections to the 4th Canadian Parliament were held to elect members of the House of Commons of Canada between the 1878 federal election and the 1882 federal election. The Conservative Party of Canada led a majority government for the 4th Canadian Parliament.

The list includes Ministerial by-elections which occurred due to the requirement that Members of Parliament recontest their seats upon being appointed to Cabinet. These by-elections were almost always uncontested. This requirement was abolished in 1931.

See also
List of federal by-elections in Canada

Sources
 Parliament of Canada–Elected in By-Elections 

1882 elections in Canada
1881 elections in Canada
1880 elections in Canada
1879 elections in Canada
1878 elections in Canada
04th